Wayne Sykes (born 27 February 1979), also known by the nicknames of "Psycho" and "Sykesy", is an English former rugby league footballer who played in the 1990s and 2000s.

Background
Wayne Sykes was born in Stoke-on-Trent, Staffordshire, England, and he moved to London at an early age.

Playing career

He was the first local Youth Team player to sign professional first-team papers for the London Broncos after also having trials with the Wigan Warriors, Hull F.C. and York Wasps/York City Knights, making 2 first-team appearances.

References

External links

(archived by web.archive.org) Ady Spencer - Harlequins RL Article

1979 births
Living people
English rugby league players
London Broncos players
Rugby league fullbacks
Rugby league players from Staffordshire
Rugby league wingers